"This Road" is a song written and performed by Jars of Clay that appears on the compilation album City on a Hill: Songs of Worship and Praise that was released in 2000 through Essential Records. The song was also featured on the bonus CD that was packaged with the Brother Andrew-penned book entitled The Narrow Road: Stories of Those Who Walk This Road Together. A live version of "This Road" appears on disc two of the 2003 double album Furthermore: From the Studio, From the Stage.

This song also uses a melody from the hymn For the Beauty of the Earth.

Track listing
"This Road" – 5:08 (Dan Haseltine, Charlie Lowell, Stephen Mason, Matt Odmark)

Performance credits
Dan Haseltine – vocals
Charlie Lowell – accordion, background vocals
Stephen Mason – acoustic guitar, background vocals
Matt Odmark – acoustic guitar, background vocals
Steve Hindalong – percussion
Aaron Sands – bass
Jacob Lawson – violin

2000 singles
Jars of Clay songs
Songs written by Dan Haseltine
Songs written by Charlie Lowell
Songs written by Stephen Mason (musician)
Songs written by Matt Odmark
2000 songs
Essential Records (Christian) singles